This is a list of members of the Victorian Legislative Assembly, from the elections of 28 February 1880. Another election was held on 14 July 1880, see second table below. Victoria was a British self-governing colony in Australia at the time.

Note the "Term in Office" refers to that member's term(s) in the Assembly, not necessarily for that electorate.

Charles MacMahon was Speaker, Thomas Cooper was Chairman of Committees.

 = Lost seat in the election of 14 July 1880.

 Gaunson was defeated seeking re-election after accepting the office of Minister of Lands in July 1881; replaced by William Wilson, sworn-in the same month.
 Johnstone died 20 November 1881; replaced by George Cunningham, sworn-in December 1881.
 Ramsay died 23 May 1882; replaced by Robert Harper, sworn-in June 1882.
 Service resigned in March 1881; replaced by John McIntyre the same month.
 A. K. Smith died 16 January 1881; replaced by Frederick Walsh, sworn-in in February 1881
 R. M. Smith resigned around February 1882; replaced by William Froggatt Walker who was sworn-in in April 1882.
 Storey died 20 March 1881, replaced by James Munro, sworn-in April 1881
 Vale resigned November 1881; replaced by Cuthbert Robert Blackett, sworn-in in December 1881.
 Kernot died 26 March 1882; replaced by Joseph Connor, sworn-in April 1882.
 O'Hea died 16 July 1881; replaced by William Robertson, sworn-in August 1881.

References

Members of the Parliament of Victoria by term
19th-century Australian politicians